The 1956 World Table Tennis Championships – Swaythling Cup (men's team) was the 23rd edition of the men's team championship.

Japan won the gold medal defeating Czechoslovakia 5–1 in the final. China and Romania won bronze medals after finishing second in their respective groups.

Medalists

Swaythling Cup tables

Group A

Group B

Final

See also
List of World Table Tennis Championships medalists

References

-